Ellman's reagent (5,5′-dithiobis-(2-nitrobenzoic acid) or DTNB) is a colorogenic chemical used to quantify the number or concentration of thiol groups in a sample.  It was developed by George L. Ellman.

Preparation
In Ellman's original paper, he prepared this reagent by oxidizing 2-nitro-5-chlorobenzaldehyde to the carboxylic acid, introducing the thiol via sodium sulfide, and coupling the monomer by oxidization with iodine. Today, this reagent is readily available commercially.

Ellman's test
Thiols react with this compound, cleaving the disulfide bond to give 2-nitro-5-thiobenzoate (TNB−), which ionizes to the TNB2− dianion in water at neutral and alkaline pH. This TNB2− ion has a yellow color.

This reaction is rapid and stoichiometric, with the addition of one mole of thiol releasing one mole of TNB. The TNB2− is quantified in a spectrophotometer by measuring the absorbance of visible light at 412 nm, using an extinction coefficient of 14,150 M−1 cm−1 for dilute buffer solutions, and a coefficient of 13,700 M−1 cm−1 for high salt concentrations, such as 6 M guanidinium hydrochloride or 8 M urea. Unfortunately the extinction coefficient for dilute solutions was underestimated in the original 1959 publication, as 13,600 M−1 cm−1, and as noted in a recent article, this mistake has persisted in the literature. Commercial DTNB may not be completely pure, so may require recrystallization to obtain completely accurate and reproducible results.

Ellman's reagent can be used for measuring low-molecular mass thiols such as glutathione in both pure solutions and biological samples, such as blood. It can also measure the number of thiol groups on proteins.

References

External links
Quantitation of sulfhydryls DTNB, Ellman’s reagent (uses incorrect absorbance coefficient)

Biochemistry detection reactions
Organic disulfides
Benzoic acids
Nitrobenzenes
Biochemistry
Reagents for biochemistry
Reagents